This is an alphabetical list of lighthouses in Portugal and its autonomous regions.

Norte

 Casa do Facho em Fão (Esposende, Apúlia e Fão)
 Farol de Azurara (Vila do Conde, Azurara)
 Farol de Esposende (Esposende, Esposende, Marinhas e Gandra)
 Farol da Ínsua (Caminha, Moledo e Cristelo)
 Farol da Lapa (Póvoa de Varzim, Póvoa de Varzim, Beiriz e Argivai
 Farol de Leça/Farol da Boa Nova (Matosinhos, Matosinhos e Leça da Palmeira)
 Farol de Montedor (Viana do Castelo, Carreço)
 Farol do Portinho da Fragosa (Póvoa de Varzim)
 Farol de São Miguel-O-Anjo (Porto, Aldoar, Foz do Douro e Nevogilde)
 Farol da Senhora da Agonia (Viana do Castelo, Viana do Castelo (Santa Maria Maior e Monserrate) e Meadela)
 Farol da Senhora da Luz (Porto, Aldoar, Foz do Douro e Nevogilde)
 Farol de Regufe (Póvoa de Varzim, Póvoa de Varzim, Beiriz e Argivai)
 Farolim da Barra do Ave/Facho de Árvore (Vila do Conde, Árvore)
 Farolim da Cantareira (Porto, Aldoar, Foz do Douro e Nevogilde)
 Farolim de Enfiamento do Portinho da Fragosa (Póvoa de Varzim)
 Farolim de Felgueiras (Porto, Aldoar, Foz do Douro e Nevogilde)
Farolim do Molhe Norte do Porto da Póvoa de Varzim (Póvoa de Varzim)
Farolim do Molhe Sul do Porto da Póvoa de Varzim (Póvoa de Varzim)
 Farolim de Santiago (Viana do Castelo, Viana do Castelo (Santa Maria Maior e Monserrate) e Meadela)
 Farolim das Sobreiras (Porto, Lordelo do Ouro e Massarelos)
 Farolim de Vila do Conde

Centro

 Farol do Cabo Carvoeiro (Peniche, Peniche)
 Farol do Cabo Mondego/Farol de Buarcos (Figueira da Foz, Quiaios)
 Farol da Chibata (Almada, Caparica e Trafaria)
 Farol da Ilha da Berlenga/Farol Duque de Bragança (Peniche, Peniche)
 Farol da Nazaré (Nazaré, Nazaré)
 Farol do Penedo da Saudade (Marinha Grande, Marinha Grande)
 Farol de Praia da Barra (Ílhavo, Gafanha da Nazaré)
 Farol de Santa Catarina (Figueira da Foz, Buarcos)

Lisboa

 Farol da Azeda (Setúbal, Setúbal (São Sebastião))
 Farol do Bugio (Oeiras, Oeiras e São Julião da Barra, Paço de Arcos e Caxias)
 Farol do Cabo da Roca (Sintra, Colares)
 Farol do Cabo Raso, (Cascais e Estoril)
 Farol de Cacilhas (Almada, Almada, Cova da Piedade, Pragal e Cacilhas). The lighthouse is disused but retained for cultural reasons
 Farol do Cabo Espichel (Sesimbra) 
 Farol do Esteiro (Oeiras, Algés, Linda-a-Velha e Cruz Quebrada-Dafundo)
 Farol do Forte do Cavalo, Sesimbra
 Farol da Gibalta (Oeiras, Oeiras e São Julião da Barra, Paço de Arcos e Caxias)
 Farol da Guia (Cascais, Cascais e Estoril)
 Farol da Mama (Oeiras, Carnaxide e Queijas)
 Farol do Outão, Setúbal
 Farol de Santa Marta (Cascais, Cascais e Estoril)
 Farol de São Julião (Oeiras, Oeiras e São Julião da Barra, Paço de Arcos e Caxias)

Alentejo

 Farol do Cabo Sardão (Odemira, São Teotónio)
 Farol do Cabo de Sines (Sines, Sines)

Algarve

 Farol de Albufeira (Albufeira, Albufeira e Olhos de Água)
 Farol de Alfanzina (Lagoa, Lagoa e Carvoeiro)
 Farol do Cabo de Santa Maria (Faro, Faro (Sé e São Pedro))
 Farol do Cabo de São Vicente (Vila do Bispo, Sagres)
 Farol da Ponta do Altar (Lagoa, Ferragudo)
 Farol da Ponta da Piedade (Lagos, Lagos (São Sebastião e Santa Maria))
 Farolim de Sagres/Farol da Ponte de Sagres (Vila do Bispo, Sagres)
 Vila Real de Santo António Lighthouse (Vila Real de Santo António, Vila Real de Santo António)
 Farol de Vilamoura/Farolim de Vilamoura (Loulé, Quarteira)

Azores

Corvo

 Farol da Ponta Negra (Vila do Corvo)
 Farol do Canto da Carneira (Vila do Corvo)

Faial

 Farol da Ribeirinha (Horta, Ribeirinha)
 Farol de Horta (Horta, Angústias)
 Farol de Vale Formoso (Horta, Capelo)
 Farol de Ponta dos Capelinhos (Horta, Capelo)

Flores

 Farol da Ponta das Lajes (Lajes das Flores, Lajes das Flores)
 Farol de Ponta do Albarnaz (Santa Cruz das Flores, Ponta Delgada)

Graciosa

 Farol do Carapacho/Farol da Ponta da Restinga (Santa Cruz da Graciosa, Santa Cruz da Graciosa)
 Farol do Forte do Santo (Santa Cruz da Graciosa, Santa Cruz da Graciosa)
 Farol da Ponta da Barca (Santa Cruz da Graciosa, Luz)

Pico

 Farol da Ponta da Ilha (Lajes do Pico, Piedade)
 Farol da Ponta de São Mateus (Madalena, São Mateus)
 Farol da Madalena (Madalena, Madalena)

Santa Maria

 Farol de Gonçalo Velho/Farol da Maia (Vila do Porto, Santo Espírito)
 Farol das Formigas (Vila do Porto, Vila do Porto)
 Farol de Vila do Porto (Vila do Porto, Vila do Porto)

São Jorge

 Farol da Ponta do Topo (Calheta, Topo (Nossa Senhora do Rosário)
 Farol da Calheta Calheta, Calheta)
 Farol do Cais de Velas
 Farol de Velas
 Farol da Ponta dos Rosais (Velas, Rosais)

São Miguel

 Farol da Ponta do Arnel (Nordeste, Nordeste)
 Farol de Ponta Garça (Vila Franca do Campo, Ponta Garça)
 Farol de Varadouro
 Farol de Ponta Delgada
 Farol de Santa Clara (Ponta Delgada, Santa Clara)
 Farol da Ferraria (Ponta Delgada, Ginetes)
 Farol de Rabo de Peixe
 Farol da Ponta do Cintrão (Riberia Grande, Ribeirinha)

Terceira

 Farol da Praia da Vitória
 Farol das Contendas (Angra do Heroísmo, Porto Judeu)
 Farol de Angra do Heroísmo
 Farol da Serreta (Angra do Heroísmo, Serreta)

Madeira

Madeira

 Farol de São Lourenço/Farol da Ponta de São Lourenço (Machico, Caniçal)
 Farol do Funchal (molhe)
 Farol de Câmara de Lobos
 Farol da Ribeira Brava
 Farol da Ponta do Pargo (Calheta, Ponta do Pargo)
 Farol do Porto Moniz/Farolim do Ilhéu Mole (Porto Moniz, Porto Moniz)
 Farol da Ponta de São Jorge (Santana, São Jorge)

Porto Santo

 Farol do Ilhéu de Cima (Porto Santo, Porto Santo)
 Farol de Porto Santo Molhe Norte
 Farol de Porto Santo Molhe Sul
 Farol do Ilhéu do Ferro (Porto Santo, Porto Santo)

Desertas Islands

 Farol do Ilhéu Chão
 Farol da Ponta da Agulha

Savage Islands

 Farol da Selvagem Grande/Farolim da Selvagem Grande (Funchal, Sé)
 Farol da Selvagem Pequena/Farolim da Selvagem Pequena (Funchal, Sé)

See also
 Lists of lighthouses and lightvessels
 Directorate of Lighthouses, Portugal

References 
Notes

Sources
 Portuguese Navy, Department of Lighthouses (Marinha Portuguesa, Direcção de Faróis)
 ARLHS World List of Lights (WLOL)
 NGA List os Lights - Pesquisa Pub 113

External links 

 LighthousesRus - Fotos
 Alex Trabas- List of lighthouses in Portugal, with pictures
 Historic postcard collection of lighthouses in Portugal

 
Portugal
Light
Lighthouses